Them Was the Happy Days! is a 1916 American short comedy film featuring Harold Lloyd.

Cast
 Harold Lloyd - Lonesome Luke
 Snub Pollard 
 Bebe Daniels 
 Dee Lampton

See also
 Harold Lloyd filmography

External links

1916 films
American silent short films
1916 comedy films
1916 short films
American black-and-white films
Films directed by Hal Roach
Silent American comedy films
Lonesome Luke films
American comedy short films
1910s American films